João Paulo de Melo Paulino (born October 8, 1983 in Assis Chateaubriand), or simply João Paulo, is a Brazilian right back. He currently plays for São Bernardo Futebol Clube.

Contract
1 January 2007 to 1 August 2007

External links
CBF 

zerozero.pt 
globoesporte 
Guardian Stats Centre

1983 births
Living people
Brazilian footballers
Clube Atlético Mineiro players
Figueirense FC players
América Futebol Clube (RN) players
Association football defenders